Joseph Schertzl (August 24, 1923 – December 2, 1979) was a Canadian professional ice hockey player who played 243 games for the Hershey Bears in the American Hockey League.

References

External links
 

1923 births
1979 deaths
Sportspeople from Budapest
Canadian ice hockey defencemen
Hershey Bears players
Hungarian emigrants to Canada
Canadian expatriates in the United States